Uncinia ecuadorensis is a species of plant in the sedge family, Cyperaceae. It is endemic to Ecuador. Its natural habitat is subtropical or tropical high-altitude grassland.

References

ecuadorensis
Flora of Ecuador
Vulnerable plants
Plants described in 1997
Taxonomy articles created by Polbot